La Chiquinquirá Church is a church in Caracas, Venezuela. La Chiquinquirá Church is the largest Catholic church in Caracas, located in a  fortress-like building with a high tower. The church contains some notable statues and paintings. The church is dedicated to Our Lady of the Rosary of Chiquinquirá.

References

Roman Catholic churches in Venezuela
Roman Catholic churches in Caracas
Tourist attractions in Caracas